Faustinus is a genus of hidden snout weevils in the family of beetles known as Curculionidae. There is at least one described species in Faustinus, F. cubae.

References

Further reading

 
 
 

Cryptorhynchinae
Articles created by Qbugbot